Harold Francis Linder (September 13, 1900 – July 9, 1981) was president of the Export-Import Bank of the United States from 1961 to 1968 and United States Ambassador to Canada from 1968 to 1969.

Biography
Harold F. Linder was born to a Jewish family in Brooklyn on September 13, 1900, the son of May L. Linder. He was educated at New York Military Academy and at Columbia College, Columbia University, from which he graduated in 1921.

In the 1930s, Linder worked as an investment banker at Loeb, Rhoades & Co. During World War II, he served in the United States Navy. From 1948 to 1955, he was president of the General American Investors Company.

Linder joined the United States Department of State in 1951 as a Deputy Assistant Secretary. President of the United States Dwight Eisenhower later named Linder Assistant Secretary of State for Economic Affairs. In 1955-56, he was a member of the Board of National Estimates of the Central Intelligence Agency. President John F. Kennedy named Linder president of the Export-Import Bank of the United States in 1961.

In 1968, President Lyndon Johnson appointed Linder United States Ambassador to Canada; Ambassador Linder presented his credentials to the Canadian government on September 10, 1968 and served as ambassador until July 9, 1969.

Linder was elected chairman of the board of trustees of the Institute for Advanced Study in 1969. There is an endowed chair at the Institute for Advanced Study named in Linder's honor.

Linder retired in 1972. He died at Lenox Hill Hospital in Manhattan's Upper East Side on June 22, 1981, at the age of 80.

References

1900 births
1981 deaths
Ambassadors of the United States to Canada
American bankers
People from Brooklyn
Columbia College (New York) alumni
New York Military Academy alumni
United States Navy personnel of World War II
United States Department of State officials
20th-century American businesspeople